Cumberland County, New York was a county in the Province of New York that became part of the state of Vermont.  It was divided out of Albany County in New York in 1766, but eventually became a part of Vermont in 1777. At that time, Vermont was holding itself out as the Republic of Vermont and was not admitted to the Union until 1791.

Located south of Gloucester County and east of Charlotte County (Anderson, p. 67 ), incorporated from Albany County (see map from 1777 Charlotte County, Province of New York), Cumberland County was fused with Gloucester County, New York to become Cumberland County, Vermont, which, along with Bennington County, comprised the only two counties in that state.  The Vermont Cumberland County was abolished by being partitioned into several new counties in Vermont and one in New Hampshire.

See also
List of former United States counties
List of counties in Vermont

Former counties of the United States
Pre-statehood history of New Hampshire
Pre-statehood history of New York (state)
Pre-statehood history of Vermont